Mangaraj Mallik  is an Indian politician. He was elected to the Lok Sabha, the lower house of the Parliament of India from Bhadrak in Odisha as a member of the Janata Dal.

References

External links
 Official biographical sketch in Parliament of India website

Janata Dal politicians
India MPs 1989–1991
Lok Sabha members from Odisha
Living people
Janata Party politicians
1948 births